Abdulazeez Muftau Owolabi (born 13 April 2000) is a Nigerian footballer who currently plays as a full-back for Al-Wasl on loan from Fujairah.

Career statistics

Club

Notes

References

2000 births
Living people
Nigerian footballers
Nigerian expatriate footballers
Association football fullbacks
Fujairah FC players
Al-Wasl F.C. players
UAE Pro League players
Nigerian expatriate sportspeople in the United Arab Emirates
Expatriate footballers in the United Arab Emirates